There have been nine baronetcies created for persons with the surname Cooper, one in the Baronetage of England, one in the Baronetage of Ireland and seven in the Baronetage of the United Kingdom.

The Cooper baronetcy of Pawlett in the County of Somerset was created in the Baronetage of England on 4 July 1622 for Sir John Cooper of Rockbourne. After his death, the title was inherited by his son, Sir Anthony Ashley-Cooper, 1st Earl of Shaftesbury. For more information on this creation, see the Earl of Shaftesbury.

The Cooper baronetcy of the City of Dublin was created in the Baronetage of Ireland on 3 October 1758 for William Cooper. The title became extinct on his death in 1761.

The Cooper baronetcy of Gadebridge in the County of Hertford was created in the Baronetage of the United Kingdom on 31 August 1821. For more information on this creation, see Astley-Cooper baronets.

The Cooper baronetcy of Walcot in the County of Somerset was created in the Baronetage of the United Kingdom on 19 February 1828 for John Cooper, Member of Parliament for Dartmouth from 1825 to 1828. The title became extinct on his death in December 1828.

The Cooper baronetcy of Woollahra in New South Wales was created in the Baronetage of the United Kingdom on 26 January 1863 for the Australian politician Daniel Cooper.

The Cooper baronetcy of Hursley Park in the parish of Hursley in the County of Southampton was created in the Baronetage of the United Kingdom on 26 July 1905 for George Alexander Cooper. The title became extinct on the death of the second Baronet in 1961.

The Cooper baronetcy of Shenstone Court in the parish of Shenstone in the County of Stafford was created in the Baronetage of the United Kingdom on 20 December 1905, for the agriculturalist Richard Powell Cooper who was heir to the sheep dip fortune of Cooper & Nephews and served as High Sheriff of Staffordshire in 1901. His son, the second Baronet, represented Walsall in the House of Commons.

The Cooper baronetcy of Berrydown Court in the parish of Overton in the County of Southampton was created in the Baronetage of the United Kingdom on 19 October 1920, for Edward Ernest Cooper. The title became extinct on his death in 1922.

The Cooper baronetcy of Singleton in the County of Sussex was created in the Baronetage of the United Kingdom on 1 July 1941, for the industrialist D'Arcy Cooper. The title became extinct on his death in December of the same year.

Cooper baronets of Pawlett (1622)
see the Earl of Shaftesbury

Cooper baronets of Dublin (1758)
Sir William Cooper, 1st Baronet (c. 1689–1761)

Cooper baronets of Gadebridge (1821)
see Astley-Cooper baronets

Cooper baronets of Walcot (1828)
Sir John Hutton Cooper, 1st Baronet (1765–1828)

Cooper baronets of Woollahra (1863)
Sir Daniel Cooper, 1st Baronet, GCMG (1821–1902)
Sir Daniel Cooper, 2nd Baronet (1848–1909)
Sir William Charles Cooper, 3rd Baronet (1851–1925)
Sir William George Daniel Cooper, 4th Baronet (1877–1954)
Sir Charles Eric Daniel Cooper, 5th Baronet (1906–1984)
Sir William Daniel Charles Cooper, 6th Baronet (born 1955)

The heir presumptive to the baronetcy is George John Cooper (born 1956), 2nd and youngest son of the 5th Baronet.

  Sir Daniel Cooper, 1st Baronet, of Woollahra, in New South Wales (1821–1902)
  Sir Daniel Cooper, 2nd Baronet (1848–1909)
  Sir William Charles Cooper, 3rd Baronet (1851–1925)
  Sir William George Daniel Cooper, 4th Baronet (1877–1954)
  Sir Charles Eric Daniel Cooper, 5th Baronet (1906–1984)
  Sir William Daniel Charles Cooper, 6th Baronet (born 1955)
 (1) George John Cooper (b. 1956)
 Maj. Arthur Hamilton Cooper (1881–1973)
 (Arthur William) Douglas Cooper (1911–1984)
 Robert Henry Cooper (1922–1994)
 (2) William Jeremy Daniel Cooper (b. 1951)
 (3) Daniel Alexander Westrow Cooper (b. 1982)
 (4) Richard Gregory Christopher Cooper (b. 1984)
 (5) Samuel Robert Paul Cooper (b. 1988)
 (6) Westrow Gerald Alan Cooper (b. 1956)

Cooper baronets of Hursley (1905)
Sir George Alexander Cooper, 1st Baronet (1856–1940)
Sir George James Robertson Cooper, 2nd Baronet (1890–1961)

Cooper baronets of Shenstone Court (1905)
Sir Richard Powell Cooper, 1st Baronet (1847–1913)
Sir Richard Ashmole Cooper, 2nd Baronet (1874–1946)
Sir William Herbert Cooper, 3rd Baronet (1901–1970)
Sir Francis Ashmole Cooper, 4th Baronet (1905–1987)
Sir Richard Powell Cooper, 5th Baronet (1934–2006)
Sir Richard Adrian Cooper, 6th Baronet (born 1960)

Cooper baronets of Berrydown Court (1920)
Sir Edward Ernest Cooper, 1st Baronet (1848–1922)

Cooper baronets of Singleton (1941)
Sir (Francis) D'Arcy Cooper, 1st Baronet (1882–1941)

See also
Cowper baronets, of Ratling Court, Kent (1642)

Notes

References 
Kidd, Charles & Williamson, David (editors). Debrett's Peerage and Baronetage (1990 edition). New York: St Martin's Press, 1990, 

Baronetcies in the Baronetage of England
Extinct baronetcies in the Baronetage of Ireland
1622 establishments in England
Baronetcies in the Baronetage of the United Kingdom
Extinct baronetcies in the Baronetage of the United Kingdom